Isaacsville is a town located in western Howard County in the state of Maryland, United States.

The postal community is the site of Eganor, a large farm founded by Joseph Isaacs in 1840.

References

Unincorporated communities in Maryland
Unincorporated communities in Howard County, Maryland